Jeter Connelly Pritchard (July 12, 1857 – April 10, 1921) was a United States circuit judge of the United States Court of Appeals for the Fourth Circuit and of the United States Circuit Courts for the Fourth Circuit and previously was an associate justice of the Supreme Court of the District of Columbia.

Education and career

Born on July 12, 1857, in Jonesboro, Washington County, Tennessee, Pritchard was apprenticed to the printer's trade, then moved to Bakersville, Mitchell County, North Carolina, in 1873. He became joint editor and owner of the Roan Mountain Republican. He attended the Martins Creek Academy in Tennessee. He was a Presidential Elector on the Republican Party ticket in North Carolina in 1880. He read law and was admitted to the bar in 1889. He entered private practice in Marshall, North Carolina, starting in 1889. He was a member of the North Carolina House of Representatives from 1885 to 1889, and from 1891 to 1893. He was an unsuccessful candidate for Lieutenant Governor in 1888 and an unsuccessful candidate for United States Senator in 1891. He was President of the North Carolina Protective Tariff League in 1891. He was an unsuccessful candidate for election to the United States House of Representatives of the 53rd United States Congress in 1892.

Congressional service

Pritchard was elected as a Republican to the United States Senate in 1894 to fill the vacancy caused by the death of United States Senator Zebulon Baird Vance. He was reelected in 1897 and served from January 23, 1895, to March 3, 1903. The victory of the Republican-Populist alliance (or "fusion") in the 1894 legislative elections, and their subsequent domination of the North Carolina General Assembly was the key factor in Pritchard's initial election and subsequent reelection. He was Chairman of the Committee on Civil Service and Retrenchment for the 54th and 55th United States Congresses and Chairman of the Committee on Patents for the 56th and 57th United States Congresses.

On October 21 of 1898, Pritchard sent a letter to President William McKinley, requesting federal marshals to protect black voters in the upcoming election. He warned that Democrats were stockpiling weapons and threatening black voters, and said that Democrats' claims of "Negro domination" were without basis. The letter was discussed by McKinley and his cabinet on October 24, but federal marshals were not sent as Governor Daniel Lindsay Russell had not made the request. As a result, intimidation by Red Shirts kept black voters away from the polls, resulting in a sweeping Democratic victory. On the day following the election, the Wilmington insurrection of 1898 broke out.

Federal judicial service

Pritchard was nominated by President Theodore Roosevelt on November 10, 1903, to an Associate Justice seat on the Supreme Court of the District of Columbia (now the United States District Court for the District of Columbia) vacated by Associate Justice Harry M. Clabaugh. He was confirmed by the United States Senate on November 16, 1903, and received his commission the same day. His service terminated on June 1, 1904, due to his elevation to the Fourth Circuit. While in office Pritchard twice offered resolutions demanding that the Senate declare the grandfather clause a violation of the Fourteenth and Fifteenth Amendments, but both attempts failed.

Pritchard was nominated by President Roosevelt on April 27, 1904, to a joint seat on the United States Court of Appeals for the Fourth Circuit and the United States Circuit Courts for the Fourth Circuit vacated by Judge Charles Henry Simonton. He was confirmed by the Senate on April 27, 1904, and received his commission the same day. On December 31, 1911, the Circuit Courts were abolished and he thereafter served only on the Court of Appeals. His service terminated on April 10, 1921, due to his death in Asheville, North Carolina. He was interred in the Riverside Cemetery in Asheville, near fellow North Carolina Senators Thomas Lanier Clingman and Zebulon Baird Vance.

Family

Senator Pritchard married Augusta L. Ray in 1877 and they became the parents of three sons and a daughter—William D. (an army officer killed in the Philippines in 1904), George M. Pritchard (a politician in the Republican Party), Thomas A., and Ida (Mrs. Thomas S. Rollins). Following the death in 1886 of his wife, Pritchard married Melissa Bowman by whom he had another son, J. McKinley. After the death of his second wife in 1902, Judge Pritchard married Lillian E. Saum in 1903.

Honor

Pritchard Park in downtown Asheville is named in Pritchard's memory.

References

Sources

External links
 North Carolina Election of 1898
 Documenting the American South: Jeter Connelly Pritchard, 1857-1921

|-

|-

1857 births
1921 deaths
People from Jonesborough, Tennessee
Republican Party members of the North Carolina House of Representatives
Judges of the United States District Court for the District of Columbia
Judges of the United States Court of Appeals for the Fourth Circuit
United States district court judges appointed by Theodore Roosevelt
United States court of appeals judges appointed by Theodore Roosevelt
20th-century American judges
Candidates in the 1920 United States presidential election
20th-century American politicians
Republican Party United States senators from North Carolina
United States federal judges admitted to the practice of law by reading law